The KLW SE24B or KLW SE20B is a low-emissions diesel switcher locomotive built by Knoxville Locomotive Works. To date, one SE20B locomotive has been produced for KLWX, and it is performing performance disassembly and operating on the Gulf & Ohio Railways.

Original buyers

SE20B

See also
 List of KLW locomotives
 List of GM-EMD locomotives

References

External links
  – Official KLW Website
  – Official Yard and Road Switching Page

B-B locomotives
KLW locomotives
Railway locomotives introduced in 2011
Diesel-electric locomotives of the United States
EPA Tier 3-compliant locomotives of the United States
Rebuilt locomotives
Standard gauge locomotives of the United States